Radu Mircea Neguț (born 3 July 1981) is a Romanian former football forward.

Honours
Pandurii Târgu Jiu
Divizia B: 2004–05
Al Ettifaq
GCC Champions League: 2006
Voința Sibiu
Liga III: 2009–10
Măgura Cisnădie
Liga IV – Sibiu County: 2013–14

References

External links
 

1981 births
Living people
Romanian footballers
Association football forwards
Liga I players
Liga II players
Liga III players
Saudi Professional League players
Cypriot Second Division players
FC Inter Sibiu players
FC Argeș Pitești players
CSM Câmpia Turzii players
CS Gaz Metan Mediaș players
CS Pandurii Târgu Jiu players
Ettifaq FC players
CSU Voința Sibiu players
Romanian expatriate footballers
Expatriate footballers in Saudi Arabia
Romanian expatriate sportspeople in Saudi Arabia
Expatriate footballers in Cyprus
Romanian expatriate sportspeople in Cyprus
People from Sebeș